Furkan Polat (born 20 April 1998) is a Turkish professional footballer who plays as a midfielder for Etimesgut Belediyespor.

Professional career
On 25 August 2019, Polat signed his first professional contract with Kayserispor for 5 years. Polat made his professional debut for Kayserispor in a 1-0 Süper Lig win over Çaykur Rizespor on 8 December 2019.

References

External links
 
 
 Kayserispor Profile

1998 births
People from Kayseri
Living people
Turkish footballers
Association football fullbacks
Dardanelspor footballers
Kayserispor footballers
Süper Lig players
TFF Second League players
TFF Third League players